Harrison Fraker, FAIA is a professor of Architecture and Urban Design, and the former Dean of the UC Berkeley College of Environmental Design.

Recognized as a pioneer in passive solar, daylighting and sustainable research, Harrison Fraker was educated at Princeton University and Cambridge University. Prior to his tenure at UC Berkeley he was the founding dean of the University of Minnesota College of Architecture and Landscape Architecture. In 2010, his architectural work was centered on new Chinese cities and transit-focused, self-sufficient neighborhoods in Tianjin, a city of 11 million.

Awards
 Distinguished Service Medal from the College of Architecture and Landscape Architecture at the University of Minnesota
 Fellow in the American Institute of Architects
 Design Futures Council Senior Fellow

Works
 Foreign Studies: Architecture (1985)

References

Living people
Princeton University alumni
Alumni of the University of Cambridge
University of Minnesota faculty
UC Berkeley College of Environmental Design faculty
People associated with renewable energy
Year of birth missing (living people)